Lutong is a suburban township in Miri, a city in the state of Sarawak in Malaysia. An oil refinery was built in Lutong by Shell Oil Company. Lutong's economy is generated mainly from staff of the oil and gas companies located nearby.

Most of the land that was previously used by Shell will be taken over by the local government in the near future and handed over to the Miri tycoon and to be developed with houses and new shops lots.

See also
Atago Maru

References 

Miri, Malaysia
Towns in Sarawak